Quincy Jones (born 1933) is an American record producer, musician, and entertainment executive.

Quincy Jones may also refer to:

 A. Quincy Jones (1913–1979), architect and Dean of the University of Southern California School of Architecture
 Quincy Jones III (born 1968), musician, son of record producer Quincy Jones
 Quincy Jones (comedian) (born 1984)